The 114th Regiment of Foot was an infantry regiment of the British Army from 1794 to 1795. It was raised in April 1794 and was disbanded the following year.

References

External links

Infantry regiments of the British Army
Military units and formations established in 1794
Military units and formations disestablished in 1795
1794 establishments in Great Britain
1795 disestablishments in Great Britain